The President was the presiding officer of the Fijian Senate.

In the 2013 Constitution, the Senate was abolished, and replaced by a single chamber Parliament.

The following persons held the office of President (note that between the first of two military coups in 1987, the Senate did not function until the restoration of constitutional rule in 1992):

References

See also
Senate of Fiji
House of Representatives of Fiji
Speaker of the House of Representatives of Fiji

Fiji, Senate, Presidents
Fiji, Senate
President of the Senate